The Florida Tech Panthers football program was the intercollegiate American football team for the Florida Institute of Technology located in the U.S. state of Florida. The team competed in the NCAA Division II and was a member of the Gulf South Conference. Florida Tech's first football team was fielded in 2013, and the final team was fielded in 2019. Steve Englehart was the first and only head coach. In May 2020, Florida Tech shut down its football program due to budget cuts that followed the COVID-19 pandemic.

Program achievements

Venues

The team played its home games in Florida Tech Panther Stadium at Palm Bay High School in Melbourne, Florida. In July 2015, Florida Tech bought naming rights to the stadium; prior to this, the facility was known as Pirate Stadium.

All-time record vs. current Gulf South Conference opponents

Official record (including any NCAA-imposed vacates and forfeits) against all current GSC opponents:

All-time record vs. non-conference opponents

$ North Alabama was a member of the Gulf South Conference for the matchups between 2013 and 2017

All-time record vs. ranked opponents
Florida Tech was 6–16 all-time against ranked opponents with two of those wins coming against Top 5 teams in the 2015 season, at #5 Delta State and at home against #1 West Georgia. Two of the losses were to ranked FCS teams, in 2014 at Bethune-Cookman and 2015 at Southeast Louisiana. The Panthers won at least one game against a ranked opponent in every season between 2014 and 2018.

^ game was played at AT&T Stadium in Arlington, TX

& playoff game

Rivalries

West Florida
Florida Tech played West Florida each year in the Coastal Classic, a matchup of the only Division II football programs in the state of Florida. The winner was awarded the Coastal Classic Trophy. The trophy stands 24 inches tall on a six-inch wooden base. It features a large bronze anchor and a 6-pointed ship's wheel with nautical sailing rope as the focal point of the trophy. A small bell is attached to the anchor with a white segment of sailing rope attached to its clapper.

West Florida won the series' first installment during their inaugural season of 2016, upsetting the 16th ranked Panthers, 42–39 in Pensacola. The following year in Melbourne, a controversial intentional grounding penalty against Florida Tech on fourth down on what would have been the game's final play gave West Florida the ball for one play to attempt and convert a 44-yard field goal for a 23–21 victory.  Florida Tech got its revenge along with its first ever win against West Florida in memorable fashion in 2018, rallying from a 21–3 first-half deficit to score 27 straight points and hold on to beat the 17th ranked Argonauts, 30–28.

All-time records versus rivals

Individual awards and honors

All-Americans
Florida Tech has had 18 players honored as All-Americans. To date, Adonis Davis is the only AP First Team All-American and J.T. Hassell is the only AFCA First Team All-American.

 J.T. Hassell – Linebacker, 2018 (American Football Coaches Association, D2CCA, Don Hansen Committee)  , (Associated Press, D2Football.com) 
 Adonis Davis – Defensive Lineman, 2018 (D2football.com) , 2017 (AP, Street & Smith's), (AFCA) , (D2Football.com) 
 Romell Guerrier – Wide Receiver, 2018 (Don Hansen Committee) 
 Antwuan Haynes – Running Back, 2016 (Don Hansen Committee) , 2015 (USA College Football) 
 Kenny Johnston – Tight End, 2016 (AFCA, Don Hansen Committee, D2CCA), 2015 (Don Hansen Committee, USA College Football)
 Chris Stapleton - Linebacker, 2016 (Don Hansen Committee) 
 Gabe Hughes – Tight End, 2015 (D2Football.com) , 2014 (Don Hansen Committee) 
 J.J. Sanders – Linebacker, 2015 (Don Hansen Committee, USA College Football), 2014 (Don Hansen Committee, USA College Football) 
 T.J. Lowder – Wide Receiver, 2015 (USA College Football) 
 Kevin Delgado – Right Guard, 2015 (USA College Football) 
 Manny Abad – Cornerback, 2015 (USA College Football) 
 Leo Alba II – Cornerback, 2015 (USA College Football) 
 Matt Garcia – Left Tackle, 2015 (USA College Football) , 2014 (USA College Football) 
 Blake Stone – Center, 2015 (USA College Football) 
 Xavier Milton – Wide Receiver, 2014 (Daktronics, D2Football.com, Don Hansen Committee, USA College Football)  
 Mark Cato – Quarterback, 2014 (USA College Football) 
 Trevor Sand – Running Back, 2014 (USA College Football) 
 Ramsey Sellers – Center, 2014 (USA College Football)

Conference honors
 Gulf South Conference Coach of the Year
2015: Steve Englehart
2014: Steve Englehart 

 Gulf South Conference Offensive Player of the Year
2014: WR Xavier Milton  

 Gulf South Conference Defensive Player of the Year
2018: LB J.T. Hassell  
2015: LB J.J. Sanders 

 Gulf South Conference Offensive Freshman of the Year
2015: RB Antwuan Haynes 
2014: QB Mark Cato  

 Gulf South Conference Defensive Freshman of the Year
2013: LB Chris Stapleton

Notable former players
 J.T. Hassell: NFL Safety (2019–2020)
 Manny Abad: Cornerback Tennessee Titans Preseason/Practice Squad (2017)
 Gabe Hughes: Tight End, Miami Dolphins Practice Squad (2016)

Year-by-year results
Statistics correct as of the 2018–19 college football season

Playoffs
The Panthers appeared in the Division II playoffs twice. Their playoff record is 0–2.

FIT earned their first playoff berth in 2016, the fourth season in program history. Their 8–2 record earned them the #3 seed in Super Region Two and a first-round home game only to be upset by North Greenville, 27–13.

They returned to the playoffs two seasons later, earning the #6 seed in Super Region Two on the strength of an 8–3 record. They were again knocked out in the first round, this time at third-seeded Lenoir-Rhyne, 43–21.

Bowl games

The Panthers played in one bowl game, the 2013 ECAC Futures Bowl, which happened at the conclusion of their inaugural season against fellow first-year program Alderson-Broaddus in Philippi, West Virginia. The Panthers won that game, 32–20, on a snowy afternoon thanks to 295 passing yards and four touchdowns from Bobby Vega along with Xavier Milton's 14 receptions for 177 yards and two touchdowns.

References

External links
 

 
American football teams established in 2013
American football teams disestablished in 2020
2013 establishments in Florida
2020 disestablishments in Florida